Cameron Bruce Crowe (born July 13, 1957) is an American journalist, author, writer, producer, director, actor, lyricist, and playwright. Before moving into the film industry, Crowe was a contributing editor at Rolling Stone magazine, for which he still frequently writes.

Crowe's debut screenwriting effort, Fast Times at Ridgemont High (1982), grew out of a book he wrote while posing for one year undercover as a student at Clairemont High School in San Diego. Later he wrote and directed another high school film, Say Anything... (1989), followed by Singles (1992), a story of twentysomethings which was woven together with a soundtrack centering on Seattle's burgeoning grunge music scene. He landed his biggest hit with Jerry Maguire (1996). 

Then Crowe was given a green-light to go ahead with a pet project, the autobiographical film Almost Famous (2000). The story centers on a teenage music journalist who is on tour with an up-and-coming band; it gives insight into his life as a 15-year-old writer for Rolling Stone. For his screenplay, he won an Academy Award for Best Original Screenplay. In late 1999, Crowe's second book was published, a question and answer session with filmmaker Billy Wilder entitled Conversations with Wilder.

After the success of Almost Famous, further films followed including the psychological thriller Vanilla Sky (2001), the romantic comedy Elizabethtown (2005), the family-friendly film We Bought a Zoo (2011), and the romantic comedy Aloha (2015).  He also directed three musical documentaries, Pearl Jam Twenty (2011), The Union (2011), and David Crosby: Remember My Name (2019), and created the television series Roadies, which ran for one season in 2016 on Showtime.

Early life
Cameron Crowe was born in Palm Springs, California. His father, James A. Crowe, originally from Kentucky, was a real estate agent. His mother, Alice Marie (née George), "was a teacher, activist, and all-around live wire who did skits around the house and would wear a clown suit to school on special occasions." She worked as a psychology professor and in family therapy and often participated in peace demonstrations and causes relating to the rights of farm workers. Crowe's grandfather was Greek. Crowe was the youngest of three children with two sisters; one died when he was young. The family moved around often but spent a lot of time in the desert town of Indio, California. Crowe commented that Indio was where "people owned tortoises, not dogs". His family finally settled in San Diego.

Crowe skipped kindergarten and two grades in elementary school, and by the time he attended Catholic high school, he was quite a bit younger than the other students. To add to his alienation, he was often ill because he had nephritis.

Crowe began writing for the school newspaper and by the age of 13 was contributing music reviews for an underground publication, The San Diego Door. He began corresponding with music journalist Lester Bangs, who had left the Door to become editor at the national rock magazine Creem, and soon he was also submitting articles to Creem as well as Circus. Crowe graduated from the University of San Diego High School in 1972 at the age of 15. On a trip to Los Angeles, he met Ben Fong-Torres, the editor of Rolling Stone, who hired him to write for the magazine. He also joined the Rolling Stone staff as a contributing editor and became an associate editor. During this time, Crowe interviewed Bob Dylan, David Bowie, Neil Young, Eric Clapton, Eagles, Poco, Steely Dan, members of Led Zeppelin and more. Crowe was Rolling Stones youngest-ever contributor.

Career

Rolling Stone
Crowe's first cover story was about the Allman Brothers Band. He went on the road with them for three weeks at the age of 16; he interviewed the band and the road crew.

Because Crowe was a fan of the 1970s hard rock bands that the older writers disliked, he landed a lot of major interviews. He wrote predominantly about Yes, and also about Led Zeppelin, the Allman Brothers, Jackson Browne, Neil Young, the Eagles, Rod Stewart, Eric Clapton, Peter Frampton, Linda Ronstadt, Crosby, Stills, Nash and Young, Fleetwood Mac, and others. Former colleague Sarah Lazin described of the youthful Crowe: "He was a pleasure to work with, a total professional. He was easygoing and eager to learn. Obviously, the bands loved him." Then-senior editor Ben Fong-Torres also said of Crowe: "He was the guy we sent out after some difficult customers. He covered the bands that hated Rolling Stone."<ref>'</ref>

Fast Times at Ridgemont High book and film
When Rolling Stone moved its offices from California to New York in 1977, Crowe decided to stay behind. He also felt the excitement of his career was beginning to wane. He appeared in the 1978 film American Hot Wax, but returned to his writing. Though he would continue to freelance for Rolling Stone on and off over the years, he turned his attention to a book.

At the age of 22 he came up with the idea to pose undercover as a high school student and write about his experiences. Simon & Schuster gave him a contract, and he moved back in with his parents and enrolled as Dave Cameron at Clairemont High School in San Diego. Reliving the senior year he never had, he made friends and began to fit in. Though he initially planned to include himself in the book, he realized that it would jeopardize his ability to capture the essence of the high school experience.

His book, Fast Times at Ridgemont High: A True Story, came out in 1981. Crowe focused on six main characters: a tough guy, a nerd, a surfer dude, a sexual sophisticate, and a middle-class brother and sister. He chronicled their activities in typical teenage settings—at school, at the beach, and at the mall, where many of them held afterschool jobs—and concentrated on details of their lives that probed into the heart of adolescence. This included scenes about homecoming and graduation as well as social cliques and sexual encounters.

Before the book was released Fast Times at Ridgemont High was optioned for a film. Released in 1982, the movie version lacked a specific plot and featured no major name stars. The studio did not devote any marketing effort toward it. It became a sleeper hit due to word of mouth.

The reviews of Fast Times at Ridgemont High were positive, and the film ended up launching the careers of some previously unknown actors, including Jennifer Jason Leigh, Eric Stoltz, Judge Reinhold, Phoebe Cates, Anthony Edwards, Nicolas Cage, Forest Whitaker, and Sean Penn.

Early film efforts

Following that success, Crowe wrote the screenplay for 1984's The Wild Life, the pseudo-sequel to Fast Times at Ridgemont High. Whereas its predecessor followed teenagers' lives in high school, The Wild Life traced the lives of several teenagers after high school living in an apartment complex.

Filmmaker James L. Brooks noticed Crowe's original voice and wanted to work with him. Brooks executive produced Crowe's first directing effort, 1989's Say Anything..., about a young man pining away for the affections of the seemingly perfect girl. Say Anything... was positively received by critics.

By this point, Crowe was ready to leave teen angst behind and focus on his peers. His next project, 1992's Singles, described the romantic tangles among a group of six friends in their twenties in Seattle. The film starred Bridget Fonda and Matt Dillon, where Fonda played a coffee-bar waitress fawning over an aspiring musician, played by Dillon. Kyra Sedgwick and Campbell Scott co-starred as a couple wavering on whether to commit to each other. Music forms an integral backbone for the script, and the soundtrack became a best seller three months before the release of the film. Much of this was due to repeated delays while studio executives debated how to market it.Singles successfully rode on the heels of Seattle's grunge music boom. During production, bands like Nirvana were not yet national stars, but by the time the soundtrack was released, their song "Smells Like Teen Spirit" had to be cut from the film because it was too costly to buy the rights. Crowe had signed members of Pearl Jam, shortly before their burgeoning, nationwide success, to portray Dillon's fictional band 'Citizen Dick'. He also appeared in this project, as a rock journalist at a club. Tim Appelo wrote in Entertainment Weekly, "With ... an ambling, naturalistic style, Crowe captures the eccentric appeal of a town where espresso carts sprout on every corner and kids in ratty flannel shirts can cut records that make them millionaires."

Jerry Maguire
Branching into a new direction, Crowe wrote and directed Jerry Maguire. The film is about a highly paid pro sports agent, inspired by sports agent Leigh Steinberg. Maguire is fired after having a moral revelation, writing and distributing a mission statement calling for sincere service to the athletes and less money for the agency. He strikes out to form his own agency. Tom Cruise played the title role of Jerry and Cuba Gooding, Jr. played Rod Tidwell, an aging wide receiver. His catchphrase, "Show me the money!", became ubiquitous for a time. Renée Zellweger appeared as an accountant who sets aside her job security to follow Maguire's charismatic moral aspiration in both work and love. Gooding won a Best Supporting Actor Oscar for his role. The film was nominated for Best Picture, Best Screenplay, Best Editing, and Best Actor (for Cruise). Cruise won his second Golden Globe for his role as Jerry.

Almost Famous

In 2000, Crowe used his music journalism experience roots to write and direct Almost Famous, about the experiences of a teenage music journalist who goes on the road with an emerging band in the early 1970s. The film starred newcomer Patrick Fugit as William Miller, the baby-faced writer who finds himself immersed in the world of sex, drugs, and rock-and-roll, and Kate Hudson co-starred as Penny Lane, a prominent groupie, or, as the film refers to her, a "Band-Aid". Digging into his most personal memories, Crowe used a composite of the bands he had known to come up with Stillwater, the emerging act that welcomes the young journalist into its sphere, then becomes wary of his intentions. Seventies rocker Peter Frampton served as a technical consultant on the film.

William Miller's mother figured prominently in the film as well (often admonishing, "Don't take drugs!"). The character was based on Crowe's own mother, who even showed up at the film sets to keep an eye on him while he worked. Though he asked her not to bother Frances McDormand, who played her character, the two ended up getting along well. He also showed his sister, portrayed by Zooey Deschanel, rebelling and leaving home, and in real life, his mother and sister Cindy did not talk for a decade and were still estranged to a degree when he finished the film. The family reconciled when the project was complete.

In addition, Crowe took a copy of the film to London for a special screening with Led Zeppelin members Jimmy Page and Robert Plant. After the screening, Led Zeppelin granted Crowe the right to use one of their songs on the soundtrack—the first time they had ever consented to this since allowing Crowe to use "Kashmir" in Fast Times at Ridgemont High—and also gave him rights to four of their other songs in the movie itself, although they did not grant him the rights to "Stairway to Heaven" for an intended scene (on the special "Bootleg" edition DVD, the scene is included as an extra without the song where the viewer is instructed by a watermark to begin playing it). Crowe and his then-wife, musician Nancy Wilson of Heart, co-wrote three of the five Stillwater songs in the film, and Frampton wrote the other two, with Mike McCready from Pearl Jam playing lead guitar on all of the Stillwater songs. Reviews were almost universally positive, and it was nominated for and won a host of film awards, including an Academy Award for Best Original Screenplay for Crowe. Crowe and co-producer Danny Bramson also won the Best Compilation Soundtrack Album for a Motion Picture, Television or Other Visual Media Grammy Award for the soundtrack. Despite these accolades, box office returns for the film were disappointing.

Vanilla Sky
Crowe followed Almost Famous with the psychological thriller Vanilla Sky in 2001. The film, starring Tom Cruise, Penélope Cruz and Cameron Diaz, received mixed reviews, yet managed to gross $100.6 million at the US box office, making it his second highest grossing directorial effort behind Jerry Maguire (1996). Vanilla Sky is a remake of Alejandro Amenabar's 1997 Spanish film Abre Los Ojos (Open Your Eyes). Sofia is played by Penélope Cruz in both Amenabar's original movie and Crowe's remake.

Elizabethtown
In 2005, Crowe directed the romantic tragicomedy Elizabethtown, starring Orlando Bloom and Kirsten Dunst, which opened to mixed reviews, scoring 45 on Metacritic, the same as his previous effort, Vanilla Sky.

The Union

In November 2009, he began filming a behind-the-scenes look at the creation of the album The Union, a collaboration between musicians Elton John and Leon Russell produced by award-winning producer T-Bone Burnett. The documentary features musicians Neil Young, Brian Wilson, Booker T. Jones, steel guitarist Robert Randolph, Don Was and a 10-piece gospel choir who all appear on the album with John and Russell. Musician Stevie Nicks and John's longtime lyricist Bernie Taupin also appear. On March 2, 2011, the documentary was announced to open the 2011 Tribeca Film Festival.

We Bought a Zoo
With production on Aloha delayed, Crowe set his next feature, the family comedy-drama We Bought a Zoo, based on Benjamin Mee's memoir of the same name. He collaborated with The Devil Wears Prada writer Aline Brosh McKenna on the screenplay. The book's story follows Mee, who buys and moves into a dilapidated zoo (now Dartmoor Zoological Park) in the English countryside. Looking for a fresh start along with his seven-year-old daughter and his troubled fourteen-year-old son, he hopes to refurbish the zoo and run it and to give his children what he calls an "adventure". Crowe changed the location to the United States. The film received a wide release on December 23, 2011, by 20th Century Fox, and starred Matt Damon and Scarlett Johansson. It received mixed reviews. The film music was composed by Jonsi.

Pearl Jam Twenty

In an interview with Pearl Jam on March 9, 2009, bassist Jeff Ament said that their manager Kelly "has had the idea to do a 20-year anniversary retrospective movie so he's been on board with [film director] Cameron Crowe for the last few years." The band's guitarist Mike McCready also stated in March, "We are just in the very early stages of that, . . . starting to go through all the footage we have, and Cameron's writing the treatment." Preliminary footage was being shot .  A trailer for the movie, which featured Pearl Jam frontman Eddie Vedder choosing between three permanent markers in a shop before turning to the camera and saying "Three's good... Twenty is better", was shown before select movies at the 2011 BFI London Film Festival. The film premiered at the 2011 Toronto International Film Festival and also had an accompanying book and soundtrack.

Aloha

It was announced in early June 2008 that Crowe would return to write and direct his seventh feature film, initially titled Deep Tiki and Volcano Romance, set to star Ben Stiller and Reese Witherspoon, and to be released by Columbia Pictures. Filming was expected to begin in January 2009, but this was postponed.

The project resurfaced in 2013. Bradley Cooper, Emma Stone, Rachel McAdams, Alec Baldwin, Bill Murray, John Krasinski and Danny McBride joined the cast of the film; filming began in Hawaii in September 2013. The film's final title was Aloha and it was released on May 29, 2015, by Sony Pictures to negative critical reviews.

Roadies

On June 26, 2016, Crowe's comedy-drama series Roadies premiered on the Showtime television channel. The show, starring Luke Wilson, Carla Gugino and Imogen Poots, tells the story of a colorful road crew who work behind the scenes for a fictional rock band, The Staton-House Band. The pilot episode was written and directed by Crowe, as well as the series finale.

Unrealized projects
In 1997, it was reported that Crowe was in talks to direct a biopic about Phil Spector, with Tom Cruise in talks to portray him.  The film was to have been distributed by Universal Pictures.  Crowe stated in 2005 that the film was unlikely to be made due to the murder of Lana Clarkson, which Spector was convicted of.  It has also been said that the film was never made due to the failure of finding a third act to the story.

Crowe also attempted to make a biopic about Marvin Gaye titled My Name is Marvin''.  That project fell apart in 2010 due to casting and budget issues.

Personal life
Crowe married Nancy Wilson of the rock band Heart in July 1986. Their twin sons were born in January 2000. Crowe and Wilson separated in June 2008 and Wilson filed for divorce on September 23, 2010, citing "irreconcilable differences". The divorce was finalized on December 8, 2010.

Filmography

As an actor

Music videos

Awards and nominations received by Crowe movies

References

External links

1957 births
Living people
American male bloggers
American bloggers
American film producers
American music critics
American music journalists
American male screenwriters
Best Original Screenplay Academy Award winners
Best Original Screenplay BAFTA Award winners
Businesspeople from San Diego
Grammy Award winners
Film directors from California
Writers from Palm Springs, California
Writers from San Diego
American music video directors
Rolling Stone people
People from Indio, California
Screenwriters from California
21st-century American non-fiction writers
21st-century American screenwriters